Barracuda is the fourth album by Mexican electropop band Kinky.  It was released on February 24, 2009 on Nettwerk.

Track listing
 "Hasta Quemarnos" *– 3:22
 "Papel Volando" – 3:21
 "Those Girls" + – 3:02
 "Avión" – 4:05
 "Diablo Azul" – 2:18
 "Masacre Sónica" – 3:09
 "The Day I Lost the Beat" – 2:21
 "Marcha Atrás (Viaje a la Semilla)" * – 3:45
 "TachiMariPedónCocongo" – 3:06
 "Fuego en la Fábrica" – 2:52
 "Por la Boca" - 3:41
 "El Tiempo" – 3:10
 "We Proudly Present" – 1:35
 "Mis Pasos, Tus Huellas" – 3:53

References

2009 albums
Kinky (band) albums
Nettwerk Records albums